Events in the year 1748 in Norway.

Incumbents
Monarch: Frederick V

Events
 The Dannebrog became the only official merchant flag in Norway. The royal standard flag became forbidden to be used on merchant ships.

Arts and literature

Births
15 July - Frederik Otto Scheel, military officer and civil servant (died 1803).

Deaths

See also

References